Paul Raeburn (born November 26, 1950) is an American author and science expositor, known for his book Do Fathers Matter? (2014) concerning the paternal influence on language acquisition and adolescent sexuality, among other topics. 

Raeburn is the 2012 American Chemical Society (ACS) Grady-Stack Award Winner for Interpreting Chemistry for the Public. He has been the science editor and a senior writer at Business Week, and the science editor and chief science correspondent of The Associated Press. He writes for The New York Times Sunday Magazine, Scientific American, Psychology Today, The Washington Post, Discover, Popular Science, Child, Self, Technology Review and other newspapers and magazines.

Raeburn is a past president of the National Association of Science Writers and a recipient of its Science in Society Journalism Award.

A native of Detroit, Raeburn now lives and works in New York City with his wife, writer Elizabeth DeVita and their sons Henry and Luke.

Works 
His book Do Fathers Matter? was published June 3, 2014 by Scientific American/Farrar, Straus and Giroux. His book Acquainted with the Night is a memoir that tells of raising children with depression and bipolar disorder. In 2016, Raeburn and coauthor Kevin Zollman published The Game Theorist's Guide to Parenting. His previous books include Mars, published by the National Geographic Society in 1998, and The Last Harvest, published by Simon & Schuster in 1995.

See also 
 Elizabeth DeVita-Raeburn

External links 
Raeburn's home page

References 
 Raeburn, Paul. "Acquainted with the Night, a memoir of raising children with depression and bipolar disorder", Broadway Books, New York, 2004.  .
 Raeburn, Paul. "Mars: Uncovering the Secrets of the Red Planet", National Geographic Society, Washington, D.C., 1998. .
 Raeburn, Paul. "The Last Harvest: The genetic gamble that threatens to destroy American agriculture". University of Nebraska, Lincoln, Nebraska, 1996. 

1950 births
Living people
American non-fiction writers
Bipolar disorder researchers